If You Were Me is a 2003 South Korean omnibus film, comprising six short films directed by six prominent Korean directors, including Park Chan-wook. Commissioned by the National Human Rights Commission of Korea for  each, the shorts deal with discrimination in Korea and the directors were given free rein with regards to subject and style. The film has spawned three live-action sequels, as well as two animated films, which deal with similar themes.

Plot
 "Crossing" - A disabled man on crutches hobbling along the streets of Sejongno, downtown Seoul. On paralytic actor Kim Moon-joo and disabled theatre group Hwol. Directed by Yeo Kyun-dong.
 "The Man with an Affair" - A former sex criminal has been cut off by his neighbors. Raises questions about the human rights of sex offenders. Directed by Jeong Jae-eun.
 "The Weight of Her" - A high school student must struggle to secure a job because of her undesirable appearance. Discusses discrimination against women. Directed by Yim Soon-rye.
 "Face Value" - Depicts work settings where job applicants are evaluated by their physical appearance in looks-obsessed Korean society. Directed by Park Kwang-su.
 "Tongue Tied" - Korean parents' extreme fervor for education is exposed as a child undergoes a tongue operation to enhance his ability in spoken English. Directed by Park Jin-pyo.
 "N.E.P.A.L.: Never Ending Peace and Love" - A Nepalese woman named Chandra spends six years in a mental hospital after she was mistaken for a Korean who had lost her mind. Addresses the human rights of foreign laborers in Korea. Directed by Park Chan-wook.

Cast
 Jeong Jae-eun
 Yim Soon-rye
 Yeo Kyun-dong
 Park Chan-wook
 Park Jin-pyo
 Park Kwang-su
 Lee Ji-hyun as Nurse
 Kim Dae-gon as Physical education teacher

Film series
There were five subsequent films in the series:
 If You Were Me 2 (2006)
 If You Were Me 3 (2006)
 If You Were Me 4 (2009)
 If You Were Me 5 (2011)
 If You Were Me 6 (2013)

References

External links 
 
 

2003 films
2003 drama films
South Korean independent films
South Korean drama films
South Korean anthology films
Films directed by Jeong Jae-eun
Films directed by Yim Soon-rye
Films directed by Park Jin-pyo
Films directed by Park Chan-wook
2000s Korean-language films
Films directed by Yeo Kyun-dong
2000s South Korean films